The 1844 United States presidential election in Arkansas took place between November 1 and December 4, 1844, as part of the 1844 United States presidential election. Voters chose three representatives, or electors to the Electoral College, who voted for President and Vice President.

Arkansas voted for the Democratic candidate, James K. Polk, over Whig candidate Henry Clay. Polk won Arkansas by a margin of 26.02%.

Results

See also
 United States presidential elections in Arkansas

References

Arkansas
1844
1844 Arkansas elections